Amir Adamovich Natkho (born 9 July 1996) is a Russian professional footballer who plays as a midfielder.

Career
Natkho was formed at the Konoplyov football academy, where alumni included Alan Dzagoev and Artur Yusupov. He made his debut in the Russian Second Division for FC Druzhba Maykop on 16 July 2012 in a game against FC MITOS Novocherkassk. He made 18 appearances across the season, scoring one goal in a 3–1 win over Alania Vladikavkaz on 31 July.

On 10 July 2014 he transferred to Barcelona, being put into their Under-19 team. On 24 November he scored his first goal, in a 3–2 win against APOEL in the UEFA Youth League. He did not break into the main squad, where only one Russian had ever played, Igor Korneev in the 1990s.

On 1 September 2015, Natkho returned to Russia, signing for CSKA Moscow. He was entered into their Russian Premier League and UEFA Champions League squads. He made his CSKA debut on 23 September in a Russian Cup game against FC Baikal Irkutsk.

On 20 June 2016, he was released from his CSKA contract.

On 29 August 2016, he signed a four-year contract with FC Krasnodar. He was removed from their first-team and reserve squads on 19 December.

On 11 February 2017, he signed with FC Lokomotiv Moscow. On 3 August 2018, he signed a two-year contract with the Romanian club FC Viitorul Constanța.

Personal life
His father Adam Natkho is a former player and coach, while his cousin Bibras Natkho is a midfielder for Parizan Belgrade and Israel. Amir is a Circassian by nationality.

References

External links
 
 
 

1996 births
People from Maykop
Sportspeople from Adygea
Circassian people of Russia
Living people
Russian footballers
Russia youth international footballers
Association football midfielders
FC Druzhba Maykop players
FC Barcelona players
PFC CSKA Moscow players
FC Krasnodar-2 players
FC Lokomotiv Moscow players
FC Viitorul Constanța players
FC BATE Borisov players
FC Yevpatoriya players
Nõmme Kalju FC players
FCI Levadia Tallinn players
FC Armavir players
FC SKA-Khabarovsk players
Russian Second League players
Liga I players
Belarusian Premier League players
Crimean Premier League players
Meistriliiga players
Esiliiga players
Russian First League players
Russian expatriate footballers
Expatriate footballers in Spain
Russian expatriate sportspeople in Spain
Expatriate footballers in Romania
Russian expatriate sportspeople in Romania
Expatriate footballers in Belarus
Russian expatriate sportspeople in Belarus
Expatriate footballers in Estonia
Russian expatriate sportspeople in Estonia